Caesarea (/ˌsɛzəˈriːə, ˌsɛsəˈriːə, ˌsiːzəˈriːə/), also known historically as Mazaca, was an ancient city in what is now Kayseri, Turkey. In Hellenistic and Roman times, the city was an important stop for merchants headed to Europe on the ancient Silk Road. The city was the capital of Cappadocia, and Armenian and Cappadocian kings regularly fought over control of the strategic city. The city was renowned for its bishops of both the Greek Orthodox and Armenian Apostolic churches. After the Battle of Manzikert where the Byzantine Empire lost to the incoming Seljuk Empire, the city was later taken over by the Sultanate of Rum and became reconfigured over time with the influences of both Islamic and, later, Ottoman architecture.

History

Superseded trading town

Findings there include numerous baked-clay tablets, some of which were enclosed in clay envelopes stamped with cylinder seals. The documents record common activities, such as trade between the Assyrian colony and the city-state of Assur and between Assyrian merchants and local people. The trade was run by families rather than the state. The Kültepe texts are the oldest documents of Anatolia. Although they are written in Old Assyrian, the Hittite loanwords and names in the texts are the oldest record of any Indo-European language (see also Ishara). Most of the archaeological evidence is typical of Anatolia rather than of Assyria, but the use of both cuneiform and the dialect is the best indication of Assyrian presence.

Importance and economy

Hellenistic times
Caesarea remained as its precessor was a firmly inland trading centre firstly for many nearby city states, secondly due to links far beyond to east and west giving it, among regional comparators in size, enhanced trade.

The city was the centre of a satrapy under Persian rule until it was conquered by Perdikkas, one of the generals of Alexander the Great when it became the seat of a transient satrapy by another of Alexander's former generals, Eumenes of Cardia. The city was subsequently passed to the Seleucid empire after the battle of Ipsus but became once again the centre of an autonomous Greater Cappadocian kingdom under Ariarathes III of Cappadocia in around 250 BC. In the ensuing period, the city came under the sway of Hellenistic influence, and was given the Greek name of Eusebia in honor of the Cappadocian king Ariarathes V Eusebes Philopator of Cappadocia (163–130 BC). The new name of Caesarea, by which it has since been known, was given to it by the last Cappadocian King Archelaus or perhaps by Tiberius.

Roman and Byzantine rule
The city passed under formal Roman rule in 17 AD.

Caesarea was destroyed by the Sassanid king Shapur I after his victory over the Emperor Valerian I in 260 AD. At the time it was recorded to have around 40,000 inhabitants. The city gradually recovered, and became home to several early Christian saints: saints Dorothea and Theophilus the martyrs, Gregory of Nazianzus, Gregory of Nyssa and Basil of Caesarea. In the 4th century, bishop Basil established an ecclesiastic centre on the plain, about one mile to the northeast, which gradually supplanted the old town. It included a system of almshouses, an orphanage, old peoples' homes, and a leprosarium (leprosy hospital). The city's bishop, Thalassius, attended the Second Council of Ephesus and was suspended from the Council of Chalcedon

A Notitia Episcopatuum composed during the reign of Byzantine Emperor Heraclius in about 640 lists 5 suffragan dioceses of the metropolitan see of Caesarea. A 10th-century list gives it 15 suffragans. In all the Notitiae Caesarea is given the second place among the metropolitan sees of the patriarchate of Constantinople, preceded only by Constantinople itself, and its archbishops were given the title of protothronos, meaning "of the first see" (after that of Constantinople). More than 50 first-millennium archbishops of the see are known by name, and the see itself continued to be a residential see of the Eastern Orthodox Church until 1923, when by order of the Treaty of Lausanne all members of that Church (Greeks) were deported from what is now Turkey. Caesarea was also the seat of an Armenian diocese. No longer a residential bishopric, Caesarea in Cappadocia is today listed by the Catholic Church as a titular see of the Armenian Catholic Church and the Melkite Catholic Church. It was a titular see of the Roman Church under various names as well, including Caesarea Ponti.

A portion of Basil's new city was surrounded with strong walls, and it was turned into a fortress by Justinian. Caesarea in the 9th century became a Byzantine administrative centre as the capital of the Byzantine Theme of Charsianon. The 1500-year-old Kayseri Castle, built initially by the Byzantines, and expanded by the Seljuks and Ottomans, is still standing in good condition in the central square of the city.

Home to many early Christian saints, such as Basil, Andreas (Andrew) and Emmelia of Caesarea. It was an important trading centre on the Silk Road.

Successor city
The city has some surviving buildings and is otherwise largely the foundations of what is now Kayseri, Turkey.

Gallery

References

Kayseri
History of Turkey
Christian saints